Greatest Hits Vol. II is the second compilation album by American country music band Alabama. The album was released by RCA Records in 1991, and has since been certified platinum for sales of 1 million units by the Recording Industry Association of America.

As with Alabama's first greatest hits album, Greatest Hits Vol. II includes many of the band's biggest hits of the 1980s, a decade in which they sold millions of albums, had 26 No. 1 singles on Billboard magazine'''s Hot Country Singles chart and won the "Entertainer of the Decade" honor from the Academy of Country Music. Seven of the album's 10 songs went to No. 1 between 1982–1989; three of them – "Take Me Down", "Dixieland Delight" and "Roll On (Eighteen Wheeler)" – are presented here in their original album-length versions, while "The Closer You Get" is presented in its single-edit form and "Fallin' Again" in its shorter LP edit.

Two of the album's three new tracks were released as singles, "Then Again" and "Born Country", both of which were top 5 hits on the Billboard'' Hot Country Singles & Tracks chart.

Track listing

Personnel on New Tracks

Alabama
 Jeff Cook - background vocals
 Teddy Gentry - bass guitar, background vocals
 Randy Owen - lead vocals

Mark Herndon, Alabama's drummer, does not play on the new tracks.

Additional Musicians
 Sam Bush - fiddle, mandolin
 John Catchings - cello
 Bill Cuomo - keyboards
 Connie Ellisor - violin
 Jim Grosjean - viola
 Craig Krampf - drums, percussion
 Josh Leo - electric guitar
 Carl Marsh - keyboards, string arrangements
 Biff Watson - acoustic guitar
 John Willis - electric guitar

Chart performance

Certifications

References

1991 greatest hits albums
Alabama (band) compilation albums
RCA Records compilation albums